The Shuliavska Republic was a self-declared entity in Shuliavka neighborhood, Kyiv by workers of the factory of Greter, Krivanek, & Co (today Bilshovyk Factory) and students of the Kyiv Polytechnic Institute. The uprising lasted a total of four days, from 12–16 December (O.S.; 26–29 in the Gregorian calendar), 1905. The Shuliavska Republic ended after the Imperial Russian Army put down the uprising.

Uprising

On 11 December 1905 (O.S.), in a sign of support for the December Uprising in Moscow, the Council of Workers' Deputies of Kyiv decided to stage a mass uprising. On the next day, all major city organisations stopped their operation. The majority of the protesting workers were concentrated in the Shuliavska district.

By a couple of hours after the start of the uprising, a "strict revolutionary order" was established. Groups of about 150 armed workers were sent to patrol the territory, which was headquartered in the first building of the Kyiv Polytechnic Institute.

Shuliavka was declared a workers' republic, where the citywide protest headquarters and the Council of Workers' Deputies were housed. Workers in the district proclaimed the republic as the sole authority in Kyiv. Among the supporters of the protesting workers were the students and faculty of the Polytechnic Institute.

Manifesto

On the first day of the uprising, the Council of Workers' Deputies published their manifesto, which proclaimed:

In addition, the workers demanded a pension, normal working conditions, the removal of unnecessary fines, better medical services, and a system of government protection.

End
The ongoing conflict between the Bolsheviks and the Mensheviks in the Council and Committee of the Russian Social Democratic Labour Party slowed the growth of the uprising. On 15 December (O.S.), the territory of Shuliavska was surrounded by the Imperial Russian Army and local authorities. The police, who, before then, usually avoided the area, began mass arrests and confiscated any weapons they found. In all, police arrested more than 78 people. On the next day, the uprising was put down by a 2,000-strong armed force consisting mainly of the Special Corps of Gendarmes and Cossack cavalry.

References

External links
 1899–1917: Shuliavka Republic and students movements in the beginning of the 20th century (1899–1917: Шулявська республіка та студентські рухи початку 20 сторіччя). Kyiv Polytechnic Institute.

1905 labor disputes and strikes
1905 Russian Revolution
Former republics
History of Kyiv
Riots and civil disorder in Ukraine
Igor Sikorsky Kyiv Polytechnic Institute